Derbyshire County Cricket Club in 1900 was the cricket season when the English club  Derbyshire had been playing for twenty-nine years. It was their sixth season in the County Championship and  they won three matches to finish thirteenth in the Championship table.

1900 season

Derbyshire  played eighteen games in the County Championship in 1900, two matches against London County  and one match against MCC. They also played a match against the touring West Indies.

They only won two matches in the County Championship but a higher number of draws brought them up to 13 in the table. The captain for the year was Samuel Hill Wood in his second season as captain.

William Storer  was top scorer, passing Bagshaw's Championship lead by a century against MCC. John Hulme took most wickets overall although Bestwick had more in the Championship. One high-scoring match was against Essex when Levi Wright and William Storer reached 170 and two Essex players scored centuries. Play did not start until three o'clock on the third day. Derbyshire had to play a second innings but declared when Young was out second ball. There was still insufficient time to avoid a draw.

Derbyshire played a non-status match against the touring West Indies which ended in a draw. The West Indies opening batsman Charles Ollivierre decided to stay in England and joined Derbyshire in a later season once the residence requirements were met.

The most significant addition to the Derbyshire squad in the season was Samuel Cadman a valuable all-rounder and eventually coach. Albert Lawton also made his debut and went on to play for the club for many seasons. Other players who  made their debut but played only in 1900 were John O'Connor one of the top bowlers for the season, William Foulke better known as an outsize footballer, Hubert Pink and  Walter Stubbings. Frank Barrs also played one match in the following season..

Matches

{| class="wikitable" width="100%"
! bgcolor="#efefef" colspan=6 | List of  first-class matches
|- bgcolor="#efefef"
!No.
!Date
!V
!Result 
!Margin
!Notes
|- 
|1
 | 10 May 1900
| Lancashire   Old Trafford, Manchester 
|bgcolor="#FF0000"|Lost
| 96 runs
| J O'Connor 5-56 and 5-69; Webb 6-25; Mold 5-20 
|- 
|2
|17 May 1900
|  Surrey  County Ground, Derby 
|bgcolor="#FF0000"|Lost
| 10 wickets
| LG Wright  134; Hayward 120; WC Smith 5-50; Lees 7-38 
|- 
|3
|21 May 1900
| Yorkshire   Bramall Lane, Sheffield 
|bgcolor="#FFCC00"|Drawn
|
| Rhodes 7-72 
|- 
|4
|24 May 1900
| MCC     Lord's Cricket Ground, St John's Wood 
|bgcolor="#00FF00"|Won
| 107 runs
| W Storer  175; A Hearne 5-38 
|- 
|5
|28 May 1900
| Nottinghamshire    Trent Bridge, Nottingham 
|bgcolor="#FF0000"|Lost
| 5 wickets
| Gunn 6-76; Wass 6-58 
|- 
|6
|04 Jun 1900
| Hampshire  County Ground, Southampton 
|bgcolor="#00FF00"|Won
| 177 runs
| Soar 5-76; H Bagshaw 5-27; Baldwin 5-31 
|- 
|7
|07 Jun 1900
|London County Cricket Club   Crystal Palace Park 
|bgcolor="#FF0000"|Lost
| 5 wickets
| Braund 7-52; JH Young 5-65; Trott 6-68 
|- 
|8
|14 Jun 1900
|London County Cricket Club   County Ground, Derby  
|bgcolor="#FFCC00"|Drawn
|
| JJ Hulme 6-27; Sladen 5-50 
|- 
|9
|21 Jun 1900
| Warwickshire   North Road Ground, Glossop  
|bgcolor="#FFCC00"|Drawn
|
|  
|- 
|10
|25 Jun 1900
| Yorkshire County Ground, Derby 
|bgcolor="#FF0000"|Lost
| Innings and 24 runs
| Rhodes 7-32; Haigh 6-54 
|- 
|11
|28 Jun 1900
| Essex   County Ground, Leyton 
|bgcolor="#FFCC00"|Drawn
|
| LG Wright 170; W Storer  176; Carpenter 112; McGahey 122; JJ Hulme 5-125 
|- 
|12
| 02 Jul 1900
| Worcestershire Queen's Park, Chesterfield  
|bgcolor="#00FF00"|Won
| 57 runs
| Wilson 6-55; W Bestwick  5-53 and 5-34; JJ Hulme 5-54 
|- 
|13
|23 Jul 1900
| Warwickshire  Edgbaston, Birmingham 
|bgcolor="#FFCC00"|Drawn
|
| Devey 256; Kinneir 156 
|- 
|14
|26 Jul 1900
| Leicestershire  County Ground, Derby  
|bgcolor="#FFCC00"|Drawn
|
| AE Lawton 124; JH King 121; CJB Wood 116; Geeson 7-107 
|- 
|15
|30 Jul 1900
| Lancashire   North Road Ground, Glossop  
|bgcolor="#FF0000"|Lost
| 224 runs
| JT Tyldesley 119; CR Hartley 109; W Bestwick  6-55 and 5–102; Cuttell 5-64; Briggs 5-31 
|- 
|16
|06 Aug 1900
| Hampshire   County Ground, Derby 
|bgcolor="#FFCC00"|Drawn
|
|  
|- 
|17
|09 Aug 1900
| Worcestershire   County Ground, New Road, Worcester 
|bgcolor="#FFCC00"|Drawn
|
| W Storer 114 
|- 
|18
|13 Aug 1900
| Essex   County Ground, Derby 
|bgcolor="#FFCC00"|Drawn
|
| HA Carpenter 151; TM Russell 139; EM Ashcroft 139; Mead 5-57; Reeves 5-44; W Bestwick  7-114 
|- 
|19
|20 Aug 1900
| Nottinghamshire   Queen's Park, Chesterfield 
|bgcolor="#FF0000"|Lost
| 165 runs
| Wass 5-62 
|- 
|20
| 27 Aug 1900
| Leicestershire  Grace Road, Leicester 
|bgcolor="#FF0000"|Lost
| Innings and 34 runs
| CJB Wood 147; Woodcock 5-24 
|- 
|21
| 30 Aug 1900
|  Surrey Kennington Oval 
|bgcolor="#FFCC00"|Drawn
|
| R Abel 193; DLA Jephson 213 
|- 

 
 
 
{| class="wikitable" width="100%"
! bgcolor="#efefef" colspan=6 | List of other matches
|- bgcolor="#efefef"
!No.
!Date
!V
!Result 
!Margin
!Notes
|- 
|1
|19 Jul 1900
| West Indies  County Ground, Derby 
|bgcolor="#FFCC00"|Drawn
|
| Goodman 104; Cox 5-61; JJ Hulme 6-76 
|-

Statistics

County Championship batting averages

(a) Figures adjusted for non CC matches

Irvine Dearnaley who played for Derbyshire five years later and George Slater who never appeared in another match were members of the team against the West Indies.

County Championship bowling averages

Wicket Keeping

 William Storer  Catches 19,  Stumping  4 
 Joe Humphries  Catches 13,  Stumping  4

See also
Derbyshire County Cricket Club seasons
1900 English cricket season

References

1900 in English cricket
Derbyshire County Cricket Club seasons
English cricket seasons in the 19th century